Edge of Forever is the tenth studio album by Southern rock band Lynyrd Skynyrd. Released in 1999, it is the last album to feature Leon Wilkeson before his death in 2001.

Track listing

Personnel
Lynyrd Skynyrd
Gary Rossington - lead, rhythm, slide and acoustic guitars
Billy Powell - piano, keyboards
Leon Wilkeson - bass
Rickey Medlocke - lead, rhythm, slide and acoustic guitars, vocals, harmonica
Hughie Thomasson - lead, rhythm, slide and acoustic guitars, vocals
Kenny Aronoff - drums
Johnny Van Zant - lead vocals, harmonica

Additional personnel
Dale Krantz-Rossington - backing vocals
Carol Chase - backing vocals
Michael Cartellone – Percussion

Chart positions

References

1999 albums
Lynyrd Skynyrd albums
Albums produced by Ron Nevison
CMC International albums